Andrea Menard (born 1971) is a Canadian actress, playwright, and jazz singer.

Early life
Menard was born in 1971 in Flin Flon, Manitoba and based in Saskatchewan.

Career
Menard, who is of Métis descent, is best known for her work on the television series Moccasin Flats (2003) (in which she played a police officer with the Regina Police Service in the city of Regina, Saskatchewan) and for her starring role as Constable Tara Wheaton in the television series Rabbit Fall (2007–2008). She is currently the voice of characters Sarah Merasty and Kohkum on the APTN stop motion animated program Wapos Bay: The Series (2005–Present).

An accomplished jazz singer, Menard wrote and composed a one-woman, musical one act play entitled The Velvet Devil, which opened to rave reviews in 1998. A soundtrack album featuring 18 songs was released in 2002 and the CBC made a film based upon the play which aired in Canada in April 2006. In 2005, Menard was featured on the compilation album, Real Divas - Torch Light Vol. II along with 15 other Canadian jazz vocalists. Menard's music has been used in a number of TV shows internationally, most notably her tongue-in-cheek ode to gender politics, "If I Were a Man", which was featured on an episode of the series Queer as Folk.

In May 2005, Menard was one of the headliners of a special command performance for Queen Elizabeth II to mark the 100th anniversary of Saskatchewan becoming a province of Canada.

Menard's second CD, Simple Steps, was released on December 3, 2005. In the fall of 2005, she could also be seen in television advertisements for SaskTel's Internet service. Her third album, a collection of Christmas/winter songs entitled Sparkle, was released in 2008.

Filmography
Skipped Parts (2000) - Dot
The Impossible Elephant (2001) - Miss Parker
Betrayed (2003) - Liane
The Pedestrian (2003) - Laura
I Accuse (2003) - Heather
Prairie Giant: The Tommy Douglas Story (2006) - Lead Reporter
Rabbit Fall (TV movie) (2006) - Tara
Moccasin Flats (2003–2006) - Detective Amanda Strongeagle
The Velvet Devil (2006) - Velvet Laurent
Redemption SK (2007) - Riley
Juliana and the Medicine Fish (2007) - Maggie Saunders
Renegadepress.com (2004–2008) - Joanne
Rabbit Fall (2007–2008) - Officer Tara Wheaton
Little Mosque on the Prairie (2009) - Helen
A Windigo Tail (2010) - Lili
In Redemption (2010) - Ryley
Wapos Bay: The Series (2005–2010) - Sarah/Kohkum/Woman of the Woods
Sparkle (2010)
Blackstone (2011) - Debbie Fraser
Hard Rock Medical (2013) - Eva Malone
Two 4 One (2014) - Julia
Arctic Air (2014) - Rebecca Morlin
The Switch (2015)
 Unser Traum von Kanada - Alles auf Anfang (German TV, 2016)
 Unser Traum von Kanada - Sowas wie Familie (German TV, 2016)
 Supernatural (2017) - Sheriff Christine Barker
Tribal (2020) - Teresa

References

External links

Official website

Date of birth missing (living people)
1971 births
Living people
People from Flin Flon
Canadian Métis people
First Nations actresses
Canadian television actresses
Canadian film actresses
Actresses from Manitoba
Canadian singer-songwriters
Métis musicians
Musicians from Manitoba
Canadian women jazz singers
20th-century Canadian actresses
21st-century Canadian actresses
20th-century First Nations people
21st-century First Nations people
21st-century Canadian women singers